David Alan Keen (25 November 1937 – 10 November 2011) was a British Labour Co-operative politician who served as Member of Parliament (MP) for Feltham and Heston from 1992 until his death in 2011.

Early life
Although born in London, Alan Keen was brought up in the Grangetown and Redcar area in the present day unitary authority of Redcar and Cleveland in the north-east of England. He went to the Sir William Turner's Grammar School in Redcar. He joined the British Army in 1960 and after nearly three years of service, in 1963, he started his career with the Fire Protection Industry where he remained until his election to the House of Commons. He also worked as a tactical scout for Middlesbrough F.C. for eighteen years.

Parliamentary career
He served as a member of Hounslow Borough Council from 1986 to 1990 and was elected to Parliament at the 1992 general election when he unseated the sitting Conservative MP Patrick Ground. In Parliament he served on both the Education (1995–96) and the Culture, Media and Sport Select Committees (1997–99 and from 2001).

Policies

Heathrow Airport expansion
On 28 January 2009, Keen voted against a motion in Parliament calling on the government to review a decision to add a third runway to Heathrow Airport. Keen had claimed to be opposed to expansion at Heathrow for many years; stating in his consultation publication on the issue he is "opposed to an additional runway" and although he was in favour of expansion up to the present boundaries "there has to be a limit" and he believed "that limit has been reached". However at a House of Commons debate in January 2009, Keen voted in favour of the third runway. Conservative Councillor Barbara Reid of Hounslow Council, said the Keens were “completely ignoring their constituents and letting them down.”, noting that "90 per cent of people in every survey we have done do not support the third runway". Further controversy arose when Keen suggested the third runway would "hardly affect my constituents at all".

Expenses

Together with his MP wife Ann Keen, the couple used their combined second homes allowances to buy an apartment in an up-market development at Waterloo on the South Bank of the River Thames, claiming £175,000 over five years. The Waterloo apartment is nine miles from their constituency home in Brentford, a 30-minute drive from Westminster. MPs who reside near the Keens in Brentford, such as Home Office Minister Phil Woolas who lives in the next street, are able to commute from there to Westminster. The couple claimed for both the interest payments on the Waterloo flat and the cost of re-mortgaging their Brentford home. The Fees Office agreed with the couple's argument that this was claimable because it was used to raise equity for the flat. The mortgage also included the cost of "compulsory" life insurance attached to the mortgages, a practice which is now banned. In total the Keens have claimed almost £1.7 million in expenses over seven years.

In 2009, their Brentford home was occupied by squatters after it was unoccupied for 9–12 months following a dispute with a building firm undertaking renovation work. The squatters' declared aim was to turn the house into a centre for war refugees, in response to Mrs Keen's support for the British invasion of Iraq.

In defending their part in the expenses scandal the Keen's stated "we have advocated, strongly supported, and voted for the introduction of Freedom of Information legislation. We are pleased that the point has been reached when full details of MPs' expenses are being published on a regular basis for everyone to see". However, in November 2009, arsonists repeatedly attacked an office block containing Mrs Keen's constituency offices in reaction to the revelations over their expense claims. Keen voted against the reform of MP's expenses in 2008.

A formal investigation into the Keens' expenses by the Parliamentary Commissioner for Standards ruled in March that the Keens had breached the expenses rules and that he regarded the breach of the rules as "serious", and involving "significant public funds". He suggested that the Keens should pay back four months worth of their claims - some £5,678. However, The Commons Standards and Privileges Committee of MPs disagreed with his findings and reduced the repayment to £1,500.

Personal life
Keen's wife Ann Keen, whom he married in 1980, joined him in the Commons at the 1997 general election when she was elected for the neighbouring seat of Brentford and Isleworth. Ann held the seat until she was defeated in the 2010 general election. His sister-in-law, Sylvia Heal was an MP from 1997 to 2010 and Deputy Speakers of the House of Commons before retiring at the 2010 election. He and his wife lived in his wife's former constituency at Brentford. In February 2010 Keen was played by Tim Pigott-Smith in the television film On Expenses.

Keen employed son David for at least 8 years as his constituency manager and senior caseworker. He also had a further son and a daughter from a previous marriage. He died in Lambeth, London, on 10 November 2011 from cancer, aged 73.

References

External links
 Alan Keen MP official constituency site

1937 births
2011 deaths
People from Lewisham
People from Redcar
Councillors in the London Borough of Hounslow
Labour Co-operative MPs for English constituencies
UK MPs 1992–1997
UK MPs 1997–2001
UK MPs 2001–2005
UK MPs 2005–2010
UK MPs 2010–2015
Middlesbrough F.C. non-playing staff
British Army soldiers
Deaths from cancer
People educated at Sir William Turner's Grammar School, Redcar